The Boone River is a tributary of the Des Moines River in north-central Iowa in the United States. Via the Des Moines River, it is part of the watershed of the Mississippi River.

About 
The Boone River rises near Britt in western Hancock County and flows generally southwardly through Wright, Hamilton and Webster counties, past Goldfield and Webster City.

Tributaries of the Boone River also drain portions of Kossuth and Humboldt counties.  Two headwaters tributaries are known as the East Branch Boone River and the Middle Branch Boone River.

The Iowa Department of Natural Resources has designated the lower  of the Boone River from Webster City to its mouth as a "Protected Water Area".  This stretch of the river cuts through a wooded valley and allows canoeing and fishing for smallmouth bass, channel catfish, walleye, northern pike and flathead catfish.

See also
List of Iowa rivers

References

Rivers of Iowa
Rivers of Hamilton County, Iowa
Rivers of Hancock County, Iowa
Rivers of Webster County, Iowa
Rivers of Wright County, Iowa